"" is a song by Albanian singer-songwriter Ronela Hajati. It was composed and written by Hajati herself and produced by Marko Polo.

Background and composition 

"" was composed and written by Hajati herself and produced by Albanian producer Marko Polo. Combining traditional and modern elements, "" is an Albanian-language upbeat "ethno" pop song whose instrumentation includes folk instrumentation. In an interview in January 2022, Hajati revealed that the song would undergo a revamp with Dutch producer Diztortion in London.

"" was independently released as a single on digital platforms and to streaming services on 2 December 2021. For the purpose of Hajati's Eurovision participation, the song was revamped and made available on the aforementioned formats on 5 March 2022.

Music video and promotion 

An accompanying music video for "" premiered on the official YouTube channel of the Eurovision Song Contest on 4 March 2022. Filmed in Gjirokastër and along the Vjosë River at Byllis and Tepelenë, the video is a tribute to the Albanian mythological snake of Bistricë. Regarding the video's theme, it was aimed to increase public awareness and conservation efforts for the threatened Vjosë River, which is often dubbed as Europe's last living wild river.

To further promote the song, Hajati went on to perform "" at the Eurovision pre-parties in Amsterdam, Barcelona, Madrid and Tel Aviv between March and April 2022. She also performed the song live during Romania's national final for the Eurovision Song Contest, on 5 March.

Reception 

Spanish singer Chanel incorporated "" on her exclusive Spotify playlist . The song further received a nomination for the Best Non-Qualifier at the 2022 Eurovision Awards.

At Eurovision Song Contest

Before Turin 

It consisted of two semi-finals on 27 and 28 December, respectively, and the grand final on 29 December 2021. While music critics were favorable towards both Hajati's vocal delivery and the song's ethnic nature, the singer has been regarded by media as a strong contender to win the contest. A postcard video introduced Hajati's performances, portraying the close relationship she had with her father, Marash Hajati, who had led the national broadcaster, RTSH, for several years. During her warrior-inspired performances, Hajati wore a black and gold costume, which featured bold epaulettes and a tight corset, to convey her strength. Onstage, the singer was accompanied by numerous dancers and a variety of dark imagery was displayed on the LED backdrop. In the grand final of the contest, Hajati was announced as the winner of the contest and the Albanian representative for the Eurovision Song Contest 2022.

In Turin 

The Eurovision Song Contest 2022 took place at the PalaOlimpico in Turin, Italy, and consisted of two semi-finals held on the respective dates of 10 and 12 May and the grand final on 14 May 2022. In March 2022, it was announced that "" would be performed first in the first semi-final of the contest.

Credits and personnel 

Credits adapted from Tidal and YouTube.

Original 
Ronela Hajaticomposing, songwriting, vocals
Marko Poloarranging, producing

Revamp 
Ronela Hajaticomposing, songwriting, vocals
Diztortionproducing

Track listing 

Digital download
"" (Festivali i Këngës)3:33

Digital download
"" (Eurovision version)3:01

Charts

Release history

References 

2021 singles
2021 songs
2022 singles
2022 songs
Albanian-language songs
Eurovision songs of 2022
Eurovision songs of Albania
Festivali i Këngës songs